The Annual Review of Virology is an annual peer-reviewed scientific journal published by Annual Reviews. It was established in 2014 by editor Lynn W. Enquist (Princeton University). The journal covers all aspects of virology.

History
The Annual Review of Virology was first published in 2014 by nonprofit publisher Annual Reviews. By this time, Annual Reviews published over forty journal titles covering different disciplines; while more than half of the existing journal titles contained review articles relevant to virology, developments in the field were not routinely covered. Published articles on the study of viruses were not easy for readers to locate, as they were decentralized in the other discipline-specific journals. Lynn W. Enquist was the founding editor. Though it was initially published in print, as of 2021 it is only published electronically.

Scope and indexing 
It defines its scope as covering significant developments in the study of all viruses, including those of animals, plants, bacteria, archaea, fungi, and protozoa. Review articles cover general virology, the mechanisms of viral disease, host–pathogen interactions, and cellular and immune responses to viral infection. As of 2022, Journal Citation Reports lists the journal's 2021 impact factor as 14.263, ranking it fourth of 37 journal titles in the category "Virology". It is abstracted and indexed in Scopus, Science Citation Index Expanded, MEDLINE, and Embase, among others.

Editorial processes
The Annual Review of Virology is helmed by the editor or the co-editors. The editor is assisted by the editorial committee, which includes associate editors, regular members, and occasionally guest editors. Guest members participate at the invitation of the editor, and serve terms of one year. All other members of the editorial committee are appointed by the Annual Reviews board of directors and serve five-year terms. The editorial committee determines which topics should be included in each volume and solicits reviews from qualified authors. Unsolicited manuscripts are not accepted. Peer review of accepted manuscripts is undertaken by the editorial committee.

Current editorial board
As of 2022, the editorial committee consists of the editor or co-editors and the following members:

 Terence S. Dermody
 Daniel DiMaio
 Craig E. Cameron
 Ekaterina Heldwein
 Harmit S. Malik
 Julie K. Pfeiffer
 Félix A. Rey
 Susan R. Ross
 Geoffrey L. Smith
 Paul E. Turner
 Anna E. Whitfield

References

External links 
 

Virology journals
Virology
Annual journals
Publications established in 2014
English-language journals